Oskava is a river in the Olomouc Region of the Czech Republic, left tributary of the Morava river. Its length is 50.3 km and its drainage basin covers 569 km2. The mean annual discharge at its mouth is 3.53 m3/s.   

The Oskava originates from southeast slope of Kamenná hora in Hrubý Jeseník, 215 meters above sea level.  

The river is surrounded by woods in upper reaches, flows through hills of Hanušovice Highlands in middle reaches and its lower reaches is situated in swampy floodplain of Litovelské Pomoraví Protected Landscape Area. The Oskava empties into Morava near Olomouc. 

The Oskava is used as a source of water for two ponds – Dolní Libina Pond and Šumvald Pond.

References

Rivers of the Olomouc Region
Olomouc District
Šumperk District